The Global Ocean Observing System (GOOS) is a global system for sustained observations of the ocean comprising the oceanographic component of the Global Earth Observing System of Systems (GEOSS).  GOOS is administrated by the Intergovernmental Oceanographic Commission (IOC), and joins the Global Climate Observing System, GCOS, and Global Terrestrial Observing System, GTOS, as fundamental building blocks of the GEOSS.

GOOS is a platform for:
 International cooperation for sustained observations of the oceans.
 Generation of oceanographic products and services.
 Interaction between research, operational, and user communities.

GOOS serves oceanographic researchers, coastal managers, parties to international conventions, national meteorological and oceanographic agencies, hydrographic offices, marine and coastal industries, policy makers and the interested general public.

GOOS is sponsored by the IOC, UNEP, WMO and ICSU. It is implemented by member states via their government agencies, navies and oceanographic research institutions working together in a wide range of thematic panels and regional alliances.

The GOOS Scientific Steering Committee provides guidance, while Scientific and Technical Panels evaluate Essential Ocean Variable observation systems. The secretariat director, from 2004 to 2011 was Keith Alverson. The secretariat director from 2011–present is Albert Fischer.

Essential ocean variables
Essential Ocean Variables are a collection of ocean properties selected in a way so as to provide the best, most cost-effective suite of data that enable quantification of key ocean processes. They are selected based on their Relevance, Feasibility and Cost effectiveness. They fall into four categories - physics, biogeochemistry, ecosystems and cross-disciplinary. Their consistent usage is promoted by agencies such as GOOS and Southern. The EOVs are:

Physics
Sea state
Ocean surface stress
Sea ice
Sea surface height
Sea surface temperature
Subsurface temperature
Surface currents
Subsurface currents
Sea surface salinity
Subsurface salinity
Ocean surface heat flux
Biogeochemistry
Oxygen
Nutrients
Inorganic carbon
Transient tracers
Particulate matter
Nitrous oxide
Stable carbon isotopes
Dissolved organic carbon
Ecosystems
Phytoplankton biomass and diversity
Zooplankton biomass and diversity
Fish abundance and distribution
Marine turtles, birds, mammals abundance and distribution
Hard coral cover and composition
Seagrass cover and composition
Macroalgal canopy cover and composition
Mangrove cover and composition
Microbe biomass and diversity  (*emerging)
Invertebrate abundance and distribution (*emerging)
Cross-disciplinary
Ocean colour
Ocean Sound

See also
Integrated Ocean Observing System
Terrestrial Ecosystem Monitoring Sites (GTOS)

References

External links
 GOOS Web

Oceanography
Earth observation projects